The Women and Equalities Committee is a select committee of the House of Commons in the Parliament of the United Kingdom. It was established following the 2015 general election to examine the expenditure, administration and policy of the Government Equalities Office on equalities (sex, age, race, sexual orientation, disability and transgender/gender identity) issues.

The committee has faced criticism for its name and in 2017 Conservative MP Philip Davies said it should be renamed the "Equalities Committee".

Membership
As of November 2022, the membership of the committee is as follows:

Changes since 2019

2017-2019 Parliament
The chair was elected on 12 July 2017, with members announced on 11 September 2017.

Changes 2017-2019

2015-2017 Parliament
The chair was elected on 18 June 2015, with members announced on 6 July 2015.

Changes 2015-2017

See also
List of Committees of the United Kingdom Parliament
 Government Equalities Office
 Minister for Women and Equalities

References

External links
 
 membership

Select Committees of the British House of Commons